Dalu is a village in West Garo Hills district, Meghalaya, India famous for coal export in North East India.

Location

National Highway 51 and National Highway 62 ends at Dalu. Nearest airport is  Baljek Airport Baljek, 33 km (21 mi) North-east of Tura in Meghalaya, India.

References

External links
 About Dalu

Cities and towns in West Garo Hills district